Dolicholatirus spiceri is a species of sea snail, a marine gastropod mollusk in the family Fasciolariidae, the spindle snails, the tulip snails and their allies. The species is named in honour of William Webb Spicer.

Description

Distribution

References

Fasciolariidae
Gastropods described in 1876